Timotheus Kuusik (5 January 1863 – 14 May 1940), also known as Timofei Kuusik, was an Estonian teacher, translator, writer and councilman born on 5 January 1863 in Lalli, a village on the island of Muhu. He was elected to the Estonian Provincial Assembly, which governed the Autonomous Governorate of Estonia between 1917 and 1919, and served the full term as a member of the assembly. He did not sit in the newly formed Republic of Estonia's Asutav Kogu (Constituent Assembly) or its Riigikogu (Parliament). He died on 14 May 1940 in Tallinn.

References 

1863 births
1940 deaths
Estonian male writers
Estonian educators
Members of the Estonian Provincial Assembly
People from Muhu Parish